Homeward (Dodomu) is a 2019 Ukrainian drama film directed by Nariman Aliev. It was screened in the Un Certain Regard section at the 2019 Cannes Film Festival. It was selected as the Ukrainian entry for the Best International Feature Film at the 92nd Academy Awards, but it was not nominated.

Plot
Crimean Tatars Mustafa and his son Alim clash after collecting the body of elder son Nazim, a casualty of the Russo-Ukrainian War. The family's history with government displacement compel Mustafa on a pilgrimage to mourn and bury in Crimean Islamic tradition. The story starts from the morgue, then on a road trip in a Jeep Cherokee from Kyiv to the volatile Crimean Peninsula. After sleep deprivation and irritability the Jeep lands damaged in a ditch. Taking the vehicle to the closest auto shop, Alim meets the mechanic's grand daughter, a young Ukrainian girl who convinces him to go to the river. It is during this time the traveling party loses their wallet to a group of local boys. Alim and Mustafa become closer as they learn how to defend their passage and regain their lost possessions. Mustafa's illness is also revealed and worsens when the father and son arrive at Uncle Vasya's home. The home is not far from the family's original Crimean homeland, and Mustafa convinces Uncle Vasya to let him borrow a rowboat to complete the remaining segment of their passage.

Reception
Collider and The Guardian have named the film to lists of the best works of Ukrainian cinema.

Cast
 Akhtem Seitablaev as Mustafa
 Remzi Bilyalov as Alim

See also
 List of submissions to the 92nd Academy Awards for Best International Feature Film
 List of Ukrainian submissions for the Academy Award for Best International Feature Film

References

External links
 

2019 films
2019 drama films
Ukrainian drama films
Crimean Tatar-language films
Ukrainian-language films
Films set in Crimea